Ahmed Kurdughli  (born 25 September 1975) is a Syrian former footballer who played as a midfielder. He was capped 4 times by the Syria national team and scored one goal, and he played in the 1996 Asian Cup with Syria.

Personal life
His brother, Abdul Kader, is also a football player.

External links

11v11.com

1975 births
Syrian footballers
Syria international footballers
Living people
Association football midfielders
Tishreen SC players
Proodeftiki F.C. players
Syrian Premier League players
Syrian expatriate footballers
Syrian expatriate sportspeople in Greece
Expatriate footballers in Greece